Christopher James Tiller (born October 25, 1978) is a former Major League Baseball umpire. He made his debut on May 28, 2005, and umpired his last game on August 19, 2011. He wore uniform number 81.

See also 

 List of Major League Baseball umpires

References

1978 births
Living people
Major League Baseball umpires